Devale may refer to:

People 
 Devale Ellis (born 1984), American football player

Places 
 Devale, Mawal, Pune district, Maharashtra, India
 Devale, Raigad, Maharashtra, India

See also
Deval, given name and surname